Atarra railway station is a grade B railway station in the Banda district, Uttar Pradesh with code ATE. It serves Atarra town.

Infrastructure
The station consists of two platforms. The station is a Category A station of Jhansi railway division of the North Central Railway zone. Recently the electrification of the tracks has started. There is no waiting room for AC and NON-AC.
Public washroom are available to all.

References

External links

Railway stations in Banda district, India
Jhansi railway division